Flinders Island is an island in the Furneaux Group, Tasmania, Australia.

Flinders Island may also refer to:

In Australia:
 Flinders Island (Queensland)
 Flinders Island (South Australia), in the Investigator Group
 Flinders Island (Western Australia), one of the St Alouarn Islands in Western Australia
 Flinders Islet is one of the Five Islands near Port Kembla.

See also
Flinders (disambiguation)